Theo Goutzinakis (born 20 July 1968) is a founding member of the Canadian punk band, Gob. He is the guitarist and vocalist. He is of Greek descent. He has also appeared in the movies Going the Distance and Sharp as Marbles. He mainly plays Gibson Les Paul and Gibson ES models. He served as a vocalist, a guitarist, and a bassist in many other bands before he started Gob with co-vocalist/guitarist Tom Thacker.

Theo appears in EA Sports' NHL 2004 under the name "Theo Gobzinakis".

References

1978 births
Living people
Canadian punk rock guitarists
Gob (band) members
Musicians from Vancouver
Canadian people of Greek descent
21st-century Canadian guitarists